The 790s decade ran from January 1, 790, to December 31, 799.

Significant people
 Harun al-Rashid
 Charlemagne
 Byzantine Empress Irene
 Zubaidah bint Ja'far
 Offa of Mercia
 Alfonso II of Asturias

References